The 2004 Andalusian regional election was held on Sunday, 14 March 2004, to elect the 7th Parliament of the autonomous community of Andalusia. All 109 seats in the Parliament were up for election. The election was held simultaneously with the 2004 Spanish general election.

As happened with the concurrent nationwide election, results in Andalusia were heavily influenced by political controversy derived from the 11 March train bombings in Madrid. The ruling Spanish Socialist Workers' Party of Andalusia (PSOE–A) exceeded all opinion poll expectations by securing a comfortable majority. Incumbent Manuel Chaves was thus able to be re-elected for a fifth consecutive term as President of the Regional Government of Andalusia.

Overview

Electoral system
The Parliament of Andalusia was the devolved, unicameral legislature of the autonomous community of Andalusia, having legislative power in regional matters as defined by the Spanish Constitution of 1978 and the regional Statute of Autonomy, as well as the ability to vote confidence in or withdraw it from a regional president.

Voting for the Parliament was on the basis of universal suffrage, which comprised all nationals over 18 years of age, registered in Andalusia and in full enjoyment of their political rights. The 109 members of the Parliament of Andalusia were elected using the D'Hondt method and a closed list proportional representation, with an electoral threshold of three percent of valid votes—which included blank ballots—being applied in each constituency. Seats were allocated to constituencies, corresponding to the provinces of Almería, Cádiz, Córdoba, Granada, Huelva, Jaén, Málaga and Seville, with each being allocated an initial minimum of eight seats and the remaining 45 being distributed in proportion to their populations (provided that the number of seats in each province did not exceed two times that of any other).

The use of the D'Hondt method might result in a higher effective threshold, depending on the district magnitude.

Election date
The term of the Parliament of Andalusia expired four years after the date of its previous election, unless it was dissolved earlier. Election day was to take place between the thirtieth and the sixtieth day from the date of expiry of parliament barring any date within from 1 July to 31 August. The previous election was held on 12 March 2000, which meant that the legislature's term would have expired on 12 March 2004. The election was required to take place no later than the sixtieth day from the date of expiry of parliament on the condition that it was not held between 1 July and 31 August, setting the latest possible election date for the Parliament on Tuesday, 11 May 2004.

The president had the prerogative to dissolve the Parliament of Andalusia and call a snap election, provided that no motion of no confidence was in process and that dissolution did not occur before one year had elapsed since the previous one. In the event of an investiture process failing to elect a regional president within a two-month period from the first ballot, the candidate from the party with the highest number of seats was to be deemed automatically elected.

Parties and candidates
The electoral law allowed for parties and federations registered in the interior ministry, coalitions and groupings of electors to present lists of candidates. Parties and federations intending to form a coalition ahead of an election were required to inform the relevant Electoral Commission within ten days of the election call, whereas groupings of electors needed to secure the signature of at least one percent of the electorate in the constituencies for which they sought election, disallowing electors from signing for more than one list of candidates.

Below is a list of the main parties and electoral alliances which contested the election:

Campaign

Election debates

Opinion polls
The tables below list opinion polling results in reverse chronological order, showing the most recent first and using the dates when the survey fieldwork was done, as opposed to the date of publication. Where the fieldwork dates are unknown, the date of publication is given instead. The highest percentage figure in each polling survey is displayed with its background shaded in the leading party's colour. If a tie ensues, this is applied to the figures with the highest percentages. The "Lead" column on the right shows the percentage-point difference between the parties with the highest percentages in a poll.

Graphical summary

Voting intention estimates
The table below lists weighted voting intention estimates. Refusals are generally excluded from the party vote percentages, while question wording and the treatment of "don't know" responses and those not intending to vote may vary between polling organisations. When available, seat projections determined by the polling organisations are displayed below (or in place of) the percentages in a smaller font; 55 seats were required for an absolute majority in the Parliament of Andalusia.

Voting preferences
The table below lists raw, unweighted voting preferences.

Victory preferences
The table below lists opinion polling on the victory preferences for each party in the event of a regional election taking place.

Victory likelihood
The table below lists opinion polling on the perceived likelihood of victory for each party in the event of a regional election taking place.

Preferred President
The table below lists opinion polling on leader preferences to become president of the Regional Government of Andalusia.

Results

Overall

Distribution by constituency

Aftermath

Notes

References
Opinion poll sources

Other

2004 in Andalusia
Andalusia
Regional elections in Andalusia
March 2004 events in Europe